Stiner is a surname. Notable people with the surname include:

Carl Stiner (1936-2022), United States Army general
Lon Stiner (1903–1985), American football player and coach
Mary Stiner, American professor

See also
Shiner (surname)